Chato is a town in Geita Region of northwestern Tanzania, and a port on the southern end of Lake Victoria.  It is the administrative centre for Chato District.

History
Chato was originally within the Biharamulo District of the Kagera Region. In 2005 Chato District, with the town of Chato, became a separate district. In 2012, Chato District, was made part of the Geita Region.

Former President John Magufuli (2015-2021) was born in Chato on 29 October 1959, and was buried there in March 2021.

Economy 
Fishing and fish processing are the major economic activities in Chato, formerly followed by the ginning of cotton which ceased in 1998. The Tanzanian government had plans to expand the port, and undertook to build a Chato airport and a new rail line to connect Chato with the country's standard gauge railway system.  However, Chato is not a major Tanzanian port on the lake, and the ports of Mwanza South, Kemondo Bay and Musoma already have rail links.

See also 
 Tanzania Ports Authority#Ports of Lake Victoria

Notes and references

Populated places in Geita Region